Boomtown is an American action drama television series created by Graham Yost, that aired on NBC from September 29, 2002 to December 28, 2003. The show's title is a nickname for its setting: Los Angeles, California.

Overview
The show portrayed a criminal investigation each week, seen from various points of view: the police officers and detectives, the lawyers, paramedics, reporters, victims, witnesses and criminals. Despite the show's innovative style – similar to that of Akira Kurosawa's film Rashomon, except all the perspectives agree – and glowing critical reviews, the show never drew a significant audience.

The series premiered on September 29, 2002. The first season order was for 18 episodes. After airing 12 episodes with disappointing ratings, NBC moved Boomtown from Sundays to Fridays, putting the show on a two-month hiatus before it returned in March 2003. Its first season ended before May sweeps, an important period in determining ratings and thus ad revenue values.

Boomtown was renewed for a second season, but to satisfy the network's concerns with low ratings, the producers made some changes. Most significantly they reduced reliance on some of the show's signature elements. In season one each story was told in a non-linear fashion, with each character's view adding a new detail. In season two, they still would put up people's names as it followed them, but there was less new information on the mystery, and aside from a few flashbacks, the episode's events would run in order. There were changes within the cast as well. Nina Garbiras was let go, as the producers wished to focus more exclusively on Law & Order type characters. There was never any mention of her reporter character again. Lana Parrilla's character suddenly joined the police academy. The character had previously been seen as never wanting to be anything but a paramedic after her mother's death. Vanessa L. Williams joined the cast for every episode, but was billed as a guest star. She played Detective Katherine Pierce, a high-ranking officer who transfers into Bobby and Joel's division. Jason Gedrick and Neal McDonough were absent from one episode each (although Gedrick's Tom Turcotte was heard on the telephone), and McDonough was also absent from all but the last 20 seconds of the season premiere. Lana Parrilla was not in three of the six episodes. After airing only two episodes, the series was put on hiatus. NBC broadcast reruns of Law & Order in its place before deciding to cancel the series. Three of the remaining unaired episodes were broadcast on December 27, 2003, and the final episode aired on December 28, 2003.

In retrospect, the show's creator, Graham Yost said: "Boomtown was perhaps, in retrospect, better suited for HBO or FX. But at that time, HBO had The Wire, and FX had The Shield. So NBC was really the only place for it, and they embraced the Rashomon structure and were excited by that, but then when the ratings weren't spectacular, what happens is everyone questions everything. 'Maybe that's the problem. Maybe it's the music. Maybe it's this. Maybe it's that. And the doubt becomes corrosive. So when we were lobbying for a second season, we were told straightforwardly that... there was one particular episode toward the end of the first season where Fearless, played by Mykelti Williamson, has to deal with the past of having been molested as a child, and we were basically told, 'You can't do any more episodes like that.' To this day, I don't know if that was the right decision. I do feel like that was one of the best episodes we ever did. I'm extraordinarily proud of that. But you want to keep going, you want to work with those actors, those writers, that crew. You want to take a shot, and you're hoping you will succeed, but we didn't. So there's a part of me that regrets the abbreviated second season, but there's also a part of me that's like, 'Eh. We gave it a shot. 

Boomtown received several awards and nominations, including Emmy Awards, Golden Satellite Awards, and Television Critics Association Awards.

Cast and characters

Main
Donnie Wahlberg as Los Angeles Police Department Detective II Joel Stevens
Neal McDonough as Los Angeles County Assistant District Attorney David McNorris
Mykelti Williamson as Los Angeles Police Department Detective II Bobby 'Fearless' Smith
Gary Basaraba as Los Angeles Police Department Police Officer III Ray Hechler
Nina Garbiras as Andrea Little, a reporter (season one)
Lana Parrilla as Teresa Ortiz, a paramedic in season one, and a rookie police officer in season two
Jason Gedrick as Los Angeles Police Department Police Officer II Tom Turcotte

Recurring
Megan Ward as Kelly Stevens
David Proval as Los Angeles Police Department Detective II Paul Turcotte
Dorian Harewood as Los Angeles Police Department Captain Ron Hicks
Kelly Rowan as Marian McNorris (season one)
Erich Anderson as Ben Fisher (season one)
Kim Murphy as Susan (season one)
Matt Craven as Dr. Michael Hirsch (season one)
Rick Gomez as Detective Daniel Ramos (season one)
Kelly Hu as Rachel Durrel (season two)
Vanessa L. Williams as Los Angeles Police Department Detective III Katherine Pierce (season two)

Episodes

Series overview

Season 1 (2002–03)

Season 2 (2003)

Reception

Critical response
Boomtown received largely positive reviews from critics. On Rotten Tomatoes, the first season has an approval rating of 96% with an average score of 10/10 based on 26 reviews. The website's critical consensus is, "Boomtown gives the police procedural innovative pep with its dense ensemble and warring perspectives, bringing a refreshing moral ambiguity to primetime." On Metacritic, the first season has a score of 89 out of 100 based on 31 reviews, signifying "universal acclaim".

Awards and nominations

DVD release
Lionsgate Home Entertainment release Season 1 of Boomtown on DVD in Region 1 on July 20, 2004. Season 1 was subsequently released in Region 2 as well.  Despite strong sales of season one and popular demand on TV-DVD websites, season 2 was never released in the USA or UK. The season two episodes were made available, however, on the French DVD box set Boomtown Complet, which also includes a short interview with French film critic Alain Carraze, who offers comments about the show. The DVD's released in the United States contain an optional commentary soundtrack by individuals who were involved in making the show but this is absent from the French and British DVD releases.

The Region 1 release has been discontinued and is now out of print.

References

External links

 

2000s American crime drama television series
2000s American police procedural television series
2002 American television series debuts
2003 American television series endings
American action television series
English-language television shows
Fictional portrayals of the Los Angeles Police Department
NBC original programming
Peabody Award-winning television programs
Television series by DreamWorks Television
Television series by Universal Television
Television shows set in Los Angeles
Nonlinear narrative television series